Fran Brodić (born 8 January 1997) is a Croatian footballer currently playing for Varaždin  in the Croatian First Football League. Brodić represented Croatia at under-21 level.

Club career
Brodić made his first-team debut for Dinamo Zagreb on 14 April 2013, as an 85th-minute substitute in a 2–0 win at home to Inter Zaprešić in the Prva HNL. At 16 years 3 months and 6 days, he became Dinamo's youngest ever debutant.

On 2 September 2019, his contract with Catania was dissolved by mutual consent.

On 11 October 2019 he signed with Serie C club Reggiana until the end of the 2019–20 season, with an extension option for an additional year.

In October 2020 Brodić rejoined, after 15 years, his first club NK Kustošija to play in the Croatian Second Football League.

Career statistics

References

External links
 

1997 births
Living people
Footballers from Zagreb
Association football forwards
Croatian footballers
Croatia youth international footballers
Croatia under-21 international footballers
GNK Dinamo Zagreb players
Club Brugge KV players
Royal Antwerp F.C. players
K.S.V. Roeselare players
Catania S.S.D. players
A.C. Reggiana 1919 players
NK Kustošija players
HNK Gorica players
NK Varaždin (2012) players
Croatian Football League players
Challenger Pro League players
Serie C players
Croatian expatriate footballers
Expatriate footballers in Belgium
Croatian expatriate sportspeople in Belgium
Expatriate footballers in Italy
Croatian expatriate sportspeople in Italy